Tiago-Marti Escorza (born 25 August 1997) is a French footballer who plays as an attacking midfielder for Swiss Promotion League club Nyon. Born in France, Escorza is of Spanish and Polish descent.

References

1997 births
Living people
People from Corbeil-Essonnes
Footballers from Essonne
French footballers
French expatriate footballers
French people of Spanish descent
French people of Polish descent
Association football midfielders
INF Clairefontaine players
Paris Saint-Germain F.C. players
Paris FC players
FC Lausanne-Sport players
FC Stade Nyonnais players
Championnat National 3 players
Swiss Super League players
Swiss Challenge League players
Swiss Promotion League players
Expatriate footballers in Switzerland
French expatriate sportspeople in Switzerland